Seven (stylized as SE7EN) is a comic book edited by David Seidman and Ralph Tedesco. It was published as a hardcover edition by Zenescope Entertainment on January 15, 2008, and is based on the 1995 film of the same name directed by David Fincher. Zenescope acquired the license to adapt the film after building a strong relationship with New Line Cinema, the owner of the film.<ref>[http://www.comicbookresources.com/?page=article&old=1&id=7216 Comic Book Resources.com Horrific sins: SE7EN" comes to comics this September]</ref>

Publication history
The series, originally published in seven monthly issue series from September 2006 to October 2007, was collected in one hardcover volume in January 2008.

Plot summary
In a departure from the film, which was told from the perspective of two homicide detectives from New York City, Somerset (played by Morgan Freeman) and Mills (played by Brad Pitt), the book Seven'' is told from the perspective of John Doe (the story's killer, portrayed on film by Kevin Spacey). Doe is attempting to use seven deadly sins to prove a point about the world.

Prints
Each 32-page issue featured a different creative team and a different deadly sin:

References

External links

Comic book limited series
Horror comics
Comics based on films
Seven deadly sins in popular culture
2006 comics debuts
2007 comics endings